Old Fort Argyle Site is a historic site near Savannah. It is in Fort Stewart in Bryan County, Georgia. It was an English military settlement. It was added to the National Register of Historic Places on March 31, 1975. Access is restricted.

There were actually three forts near this location - the first being constructed in 1734, a second around 1742, and a third in the late 1750s.

There is a historical marker nearby, which reads:

The marker is located on GA 144, 4 miles west of junction with US 17 (at N31° 58.362', W81° 22.602').

See also
Fort Frederica National Monument
National Register of Historic Places listings in Bryan County, Georgia

References
Elliott, Daniel T., 1997 Argyle, Historical Archaeological Study of a Colonial Fort in Bryan County, Georgia. LAMAR Institute Publication Series, Report Number 37. Accessed 8/14/16.

External links
 PDF about Fort Argyle

Archaeological sites on the National Register of Historic Places in Georgia (U.S. state)
Colonial forts in Georgia (U.S. state)
National Register of Historic Places in Chatham County, Georgia